van Eeghen is a surname. Notable people with the surname include:

Isabella Henriette van Eeghen (1913–1996), Dutch historian
Esmée van Eeghen (1918-1944), Dutch resistance fighter in World War II
Mark van Eeghen (born 1952), American football player
Hester van Eeghen (1958–2021), Dutch designer

 

Surnames of Dutch origin